Secondary Highway 538, commonly referred to as Highway 538, is a provincially maintained highway in the Canadian province of Ontario. The route was designated in 1956 and has remained unchanged since.

Route description 
Highway 538 is a short and narrow highway which follows a former alignment of Highway 17, at which it begins and ends. It starts in the west at Algoma Mills, travelling east initially before turning south and passing beneath a CPR rail line. The route descends along the western bank of Lauzon Creek before turning southeast and crossing it.
It passes several shops and continues towards the shoreline, at which point it curves northeast. The highway travels around Bootlegger's Bay before diverging from the shoreline, turning north and ascending towards Highway 17. From this point until its eastern terminus, the highway travels alongside a parcel of the North Channel Inshore Provincial Park, a waterway park scattered along the North Channel shoreline.
Immediately south of Highway 17 and the CPR tracks, the route curves east and follows parallel to Highway 17 for several kilometres. Following this, it abruptly curves north, crosses the railway tracks and ends.

Like other provincial routes in Ontario, Highway 538 is maintained by the Ministry of Transportation of Ontario. In 2016, traffic surveys conducted by the ministry showed that on average, 150vehicles used the highway daily along the section between Highway17 and Miranda Boulevard in Algoma Mills while 60vehicles did so each day along the section east of there, the highest and lowest counts along the highway, respectively.

History 
Highway 538 was designated in 1956.
It was once an alignment of Highway 17, but was bypassed due to several sharp corners. The route has not changed since it was designated.

Major intersections 
The following table lists the major junctions along Highway 538. The entirety of the highway is located within Algoma District.
{| class=wikitable
!scope=col|Location
!scope=col|km
!scope=col|Destinations
!scope=col|Notes
|-
|rowspan="2"|Algoma Mills
|0.0
|
|Trans-Canada Highway 
|-
|0.8
|Miranda Boulevard
|
|-
|Township of North Shore
|5.4
|
|Trans-Canada Highway

References

External links 
 Highway 538 at OntHighways.com

538
Roads in Algoma District